Itamar Vieira Junior (born 1979) is a Brazilian writer. He was born in Salvador, Bahia. He has a PhD in Ethnic and African Studies from the Federal University of Bahia. His main works include a short story collection titled A oração do carrasco [The executioner's prayer] (2017), that was a finalist for the Prêmio Jabuti de Literatura. His most recent novel, Torto Arado [Crooked plow], won the Prêmio LeYa in 2018, the Prêmio Oceanos and the Prêmio Jabuti, both in 2020.

Biography 
Vieira Junior was born in Salvador, in 1979. As a teenager, he lived in the state of Pernambuco, and later in the city of São Luís. He started studying geography at the undergraduate course at the Federal University of Bahia, being the first recipient of the Milton Santos Scholarship, dedicated to low-income black youth. He graduated in Geography and completed a master's degree. He holds a doctorate in Ethnic and African Studies from the Federal University of Bahia with a study on the formation of quilombola communities in the interior of the Brazilian Northeast. Itamar is also a public servant at INCRA, the state agency responsible for conducting land reform in Brazil.

References

External links 

 

1979 births
21st-century Brazilian writers
Living people
People from Salvador, Bahia